The Isbell House, located at 639 Heights Boulevard in Houston, Texas, was listed on the National Register of Historic Places on June 22, 1983. It is one of 104 structures nominated to the Register in 1983 as part of the Houston Heights Multiple Resource Area in the Houston Heights neighborhood.

See also
 National Register of Historic Places listings in Harris County, Texas

References

Houses in Houston
Houses on the National Register of Historic Places in Texas
National Register of Historic Places in Houston